The Highlands Historic District in Grand Teton National Park is a former private inholding within the park boundary. The inholding began as a 1914 homestead belonging to Harry and Elizabeth Sensenbach, who began in the 1920s to supplement their income by catering to automobile-borne tourists.  In 1946 the property was purchased by Charles Byron, Jeanne Jenkins and Gloria Jenkins Wardell, who expanded the accommodations by one or two cabins a year in a U-shaped layout around a central lodge. The lodge and cabins are constructed in a rustic log style, considered compatible with park architecture. The Highlands was neither an auto camp, which encouraged short stays, nor a dude ranch, which provided ranch-style activities. The Highlands encouraged stays of moderate length, providing a variety of relatively sedentary amenities. It was the last private-accommodation camp to be built in the park before the Mission 66  program created concessioner-operated facilities on public lands.

The National Park Service acquired the property in 1972 and uses it to house seasonal employees. The acquisition allowed the Park Service to demolish most of the nearby Mages Ranch - Elbo Ranch property. The Highlands was placed on the National Register of Historic Places on August 19, 1998.

See also
 Historical buildings and structures of Grand Teton National Park

References

External links

Auto Camps at Grand Teton National Park
Highlands Historic District at the Wyoming State Historic Preservation Office

Buildings and structures in Grand Teton National Park
Hotel buildings on the National Register of Historic Places in Wyoming
National Park Service rustic in Wyoming
Historic districts on the National Register of Historic Places in Wyoming
National Register of Historic Places in Grand Teton National Park